The One Hundred Twenty-third Ohio General Assembly was the legislative body of the state of Ohio in 1999 and 2000. In this General Assembly, both the Ohio Senate and the Ohio House of Representatives were controlled by the Republican Party.  In the Senate, there were 21 Republicans and 12 Democrats. In the House, there were 59 Republicans and 40 Democrats.

New Members of the Senate

Vacancies
January 5, 1999: Representative Tom Johnson (R-96th) resigns to become a member of the Cabinet of Governor Bob Taft.
February 17, 1999: Representative Ross Boggs (D-5th) resigns.
May 30, 1999: Representative Otto Beatty Jr. resigns.
June 30, 1999: Representative Joy Padgett (R-95th) resigns.
August 9, 1999: Representative Ed Core (R-87th) died.
August 10, 1999: Representative Darrell Opfer (D-53rd) resigns to become Economic Development Director of Ottawa County.
September 14, 1999: Representative Sally Perz (D-52nd) resigns to take a position with the University of Toledo.
November 4, 1999: Representative E. J. Thomas (D-27th) resigns to take a job in the private sector.
November 4, 1999: Representative Joe Haines (R-74th) resigns to work in the Ohio Department of Agriculture.
December 31, 1999: Representative Johnnie Maier (D-56th) resigns to become Clerk of the Massillon Municipal Court.
August 15, 2000: Representative Bill Harris (R-93rd) resigns to take a seat in the Ohio Senate.
September 12, 2000: Representative David Robinson (R-27th) resigns.

Appointments
January 5, 1999: Michael G. Verich is appointed to House District 66.
January 5, 1999: Nancy P. Hollister is appointed to House District 96.
February 17, 1999: George Distel is appointed to House District 5.
May 31, 1999; Joyce Beatty is appointed.
June 30, 1999: Jim Aslanides is appointed to House District 95.
September 8, 1999: Tony Core is appointed to House District 87.
September 8, 1999: Chris Redfern is appointed to House District 53.
October 20, 1999: Jim Mettler appointed to House District 52.
December 8, 1999: David J. Robinson appointed to House District 27.
December 8, 1999: Chris Widener appointed to House District 74.
January 11, 2000: Mike Stevens appointed to House District 56.
September 12, 2000: Thom Collier is appointed to House District 93.
September 13, 2000: Jim Hughes is appointed to House District 27.

Senate

Leadership

Majority leadership
 President of the Senate: Richard Finan
 President pro tempore of the Senate: Robert Cupp
 Assistant pro tempore: Bruce E. Johnson
 Whip: Merle G. Kearns

Minority leadership
 Leader: Ben Espy
 Assistant Leader: Leigh Herington
 Whip: Rhine McLin
 Assistant Whip: Dan Brady

Members of the 123rd Ohio Senate

House of Representatives

Leadership

Majority leadership
 Speaker of the House: Jo Ann Davidson
 President pro tempore of the Senate: Randy Gardner
 Floor Leader: Pat Tiberi
 Assistant Majority Floor Leader: Jim Buchy
 Majority Whip: Bill Harris
 Assistant Majority Whip: Larry Householder

Minority leadership
 Leader: Jack Ford
 Assistant Leader: Barbara C. Pringle
 Whip: Dan Metelsky
 Assistant Whip: Charlie Wilson

Members of the 123rd Ohio House of Representatives

Appt.- Member was appointed to current House Seat

See also
Ohio House of Representatives membership, 126th General Assembly
Ohio House of Representatives membership, 125th General Assembly

References
Ohio House of Representatives official website
Project Vote Smart – State House of Ohio
Map of Ohio House Districts
Ohio District Maps 2002–2012
Ohio House of Representatives: November 3, 1998  Ohio Secretary of State

Ohio legislative sessions
Ohio
Ohio
1999 in Ohio
2000 in Ohio
de:Repräsentantenhaus von Ohio